Listen to the Color is the fifth and final studio album by Santa Cruz-based deathcore troupe Arsonists Get All the Girls. The record was released August 1, 2013.

Track listing

Personnel 
A.G.A.T.G.
 Remi Rodburg – vocals, keyboards
 Garin Rosen – drums
 Jaeson Bardoni - bass
 Greg Howell – guitar
 Sean Richmond – vocals, keyboards
Other credits
 Zack Ohren - production, mixing, mastering
 Ethan Jones - album artwork

Arsonists Get All the Girls albums
2013 albums